Thomas Gustafsson (born 25 February 1968), professionally known as Thomas G:son, is a Swedish composer and musician.

He is best known for the ninety-nine songs he has written for national finals of twelve countries for the Eurovision Song Contest: sixty-one for Sweden, eleven for Spain, six for Norway, five for Denmark and Finland, three for Georgia, two for Poland & Malta, and one each for Cyprus, Latvia, Romania and Belgium. He reached the milestone of 60 entries at Melodifestivalen at Melodifestivalen 2020. He has also reached the Eurovision Song Contest thirteen times, three times each for Sweden, Spain, and Georgia, twice for Cyprus and once each for Norway, Denmark and Malta. In 2012, G:son achieved his first victory as a winning composer at the Eurovision Song Contest with the entry "Euphoria".

G:son is from Skövde, Västergötland, Sweden. He has been a full-time songwriter since 1998. In addition to writing and composing songs in many musical genres for a living, he plays the guitar in the hard rock band, Masquerade.

Eurovision Song Contest

Junior Eurovision Entries

National final entries

Melodifestivalen entries (Sweden)

"Natten är min vän" by Cleo Nilsson (1999), 8th place
"Lyssna till ditt hjärta" ("Listen To Your Heartbeat") by Friends (2001), 1st place (5th at ESC 2001)
"Vem é dé du vill ha?" by Kikki, Lotta & Bettan (2002), 3rd place
"Ingenting är större än vi" by Arvingarna (2002), 6th place (Semi-final)
"Världen utanför" by Barbados (2002), 4th place
"What Difference Does It Make?" by Poets (2002), 3rd place (Semi-final)
"Hela världen för mig" by Sanna Nielsen (2003), 5th place
"C'est la vie" by Hanson, Carson & Malmkvist (2004), 10th place
"Tango Tango" by Petra Nielsen (2004), 4th place
"Säg att du har ångrat dig" by Anne-Lie Rydé (2004), 4th place (Semi-final)
"Långt bortom tid och rum" by Mathias Holmgren (2005), 4th place (Semi-final)
"As If Tomorrow Will Never Come" by Katrina & The Nameless  (2005), 3rd place (Semi-final)
"Så nära" by Anne-Lie Rydé (2005), 5th place (Semi-final)
"Evighet" ("Invincible") by Carola (2006), 1st place (5th at ESC 2006)
"Ge mig en kaka till kaffet" by Östen med Resten (2006), 6th place (Semi-final)
"Idag & imorgon" by Kikki Danielsson (2006), 10th place
"Innan natten är över" by Kayo (2006), 6th place (Semi-final)
"When Loves Coming Back Again" by Jessica Folcker (2006), 7th place (Semi-final)
"Silverland" by Roger Pontare (2006), 4th place (Semi-final)
"Amanda" by Jimmy Jansson (2007), eliminated in Second-Chance Round
"Samba Sambero" by Anna Book (2007), 9th place
"Här för mig själv" by Maja Gullstrand (2009), 8th place (Semi-final)
"Du vinner över mig" by Mikael Rickfors (2009), 5th place (Semi-final)
"Show Me Heaven" by Lili & Susie (2009), eliminated in Second-Chance Round
"Thursdays" by Lovestoned (2010), 6th place (Semi-final)
"I'm In Love" by Sanna Nielsen (2011), 4th place
"E det fel på mej" by Linda Bengtzing (2011), 7th place
"Something In Your Eyes" by Jenny Silver (2011), eliminated in Second-Chance Round
"Euphoria" by Loreen (2012), 1st place (1st place at ESC 2012)
"Jag reser mig igen" by Thorsten Flinck & Revolutionsorkestern (2012), 8th place
"Land of Broken Dreams" by Dynazty (2012), eliminated in Second Chance Round 1
"On Top of the World" by Swedish House Wives (Pernilla Wahlgren, Jenny Silver & Hanna Hedlund) (2013), 6th place (Semi-final)
"Alibi" by Eddie Razaz (2013), 6th place (Semi-final)
"In and Out of Love" by Martin Rolinski (2013), eliminated in Second-Chance Round
"Trivialitet" by Sylvia Vrethammar (2013), 7th place (Semi-final)
"Tell the World I'm Here" by Ulrik Munther (2013), 3rd place
"Hela natten" by Josef Johansson (2014), 7th place (Semi-final)
"Love Trigger" by JEM (2014), 6th (Andra Chansen/Second Chance)
"If I Was God For One Day" by Neverstore (2015), 5th place (Semi-final)
"Möt mig i Gamla stan" by Magnus Carlsson (2015), 9th place
"Bring Out the Fire" by Andreas Weise (2015), eliminated in Second-Chance Round
"För din Skull" by Kalle Johansson (2015), 6th place (Semi-final)
"Rollercoaster" by Dolly Style (2016), eliminated in Second-Chance Round
"Himmel och hav" by Roger Pontare (2017), 5th place (Semi-final)
"A Million Years" by Mariette (2017), 4th place
"One More Night" by Dinah Nah (2017), 5th place (Semi-final)
"Wild Child" by Ace Wilder (2017), 7th place
"Cry" by Dotter (2018), 6th place (Semi-final)
"Livet på en pinne" by Edward Blom (2018), 5th place (Semi-final)
"Icarus" by Emmi Christensson (2018), 6th place (Semi-final)
"Min dröm" by Kalle Moraeus & Orsa Spelmän (2018), 5th place (Semi-final)
"Ashes to Ashes by Anna Bergendahl (2019), 10th place
"Hello" by Mohombi (2019), 5th place
"Chasing Rivers" by Nano (2019), 8th place
"Somebody Wants" by The Lovers of Valdaro (2019), 7th place (Semi-final)
"Mina bränder" by Zeana feat. Anis don Demina (2019), 5th place (Semi-final)
"Kingdom Come" by Anna Bergendahl (2020), 3rd place
"Ballerina" by Malou Prytz (2020), eliminated in Second-Chance Round
"Shout It Out" by Mariette (2020), 10th place
"Miraklernas tid" by Jan Johansen (2020), 7th place (Semi-final)
"Tänker inte alls gå hem" by Arvingarna (2021), 9th place
"Still Young" by Charlotte Perrelli (2021), 8th place
"Bigger Than the Universe" by Anders Bagge (2022), 2nd place
"Higher Power" by Anna Bergendahl (2022), 12th place
"Fyrfaldigt hurra!" by Linda Bengtzing (2022), 5th place (Semi-final)
"Tattoo" by Loreen (2023), 1st place
"One Day" by Mariette (2023), 8th place
"Släpp alla sorger" by Nordman (2023), 11th place
"Mer av dig" by Theoz (2023), 5th place

Melodi Grand Prix entries (Norway)

"Din hånd i min hånd" by Kikki, Lotta & Bettan (2003), 4th place
"Anyway you want it" by Ingvild Pedersen (2003), 8th place
"Absolutely Fabulous" by Queentastic (2006), 3rd place
"Ven a bailar conmigo" by Guri Schanke (2007), 1st place (18th in ESC 2007 Semifinal)
"Rocket Ride" by Jannicke Abrahamsen (2007), 2nd place
"High on Love" by Reidun Sæther (2012), unplaced in Final

Dansk Melodi Grand Prix entries (Denmark)

"In a Moment Like This", Chanée & Tomas N'evergreen (2010), 1st place (4th in ESC 2010)
"Let Your Heart Be Mine", Jenny Berggren (2011)
"25 Hours a Day", Le Freak (2011), 4th place
"We Own The Universe", Daze (2013), unplaced in Final
"Mi Amore", Tina & René (2015), 7th place

Euroviisut and UMK entries (Finland)

"Who Cares About A Broken Heart?" by Johanna (2002), 5th place
"Say You Will, Say You Won't" by Ressu (2002), 4th place
"I Can't Stop Loving You" by Kirsi Ranto (2004), 10th place (Semi-final)
"Till The End Of Time" by Arja Koriseva (2004), 10th place
"Domino" by Saara Aalto (2018), 2nd place

Eirodziesma entry (Latvia)

"Heaven In Your Eyes" by Elina Furmane (2006), 8th place

Selecţia Naţională entry (Romania)

"Lovestruck" by Indiggo (2007) [disqualified]
The girl duo Indiggo which was going to perform the song was disqualified because they did not turn up in time for a rehearsal. Additionally, an instrumental version of the song was sent not in time to the TV company.

Piosenka dla Europy entries (Poland)

"Viva la musica" by Man Meadow (2008), 3rd place
"Love Is Gonna Get You" by Man Meadow (2009), 6th place

Eurosong entry (Belgium)

"Addicted to You", Tanja Dexters (2008), 5th place (Semi-final)

Spanish selection entries (Spain) 

"I Am As I Am", Arkaitz (2007), non-qualified.
"I love you mi vida", by D'NASH (2007), 1st place (20th at ESC 2007)
"Todo está en tu mente", Coral Segovia (2008), 2nd place
"Piénsame", Anael (2008), eliminated in Online-Voting
"Te prefiero", Baltanás (2008), eliminated in Online-Voting
"Nada es comparable a ti", Mirela (2009), 4th place
"Amor radical", Rebeca (2009), eliminated in Online-Voting
"Perfecta", Venus (2010), 4th place
"Recuérdame", Samuel & Patricia (2010), 5th place
"En una vida", Coral Segovia (2010), 2nd place
"Beautiful Life", José Galisteo (2010), 7th place
"Abrázame", Lucía Pérez (2011), 2nd place on Songs selection
"Quédate conmigo", Pastora Soler (2012), 1st place (10th place at ESC 2012)
"Más (Run)", Brequette (2014), 2nd place
"Eco", Xeinn (2022), 7th place

Malta Eurovision Song Contest (Malta)
"Ultraviolet", Jessica Muscat (2013), 8th place
"Taboo", Christabelle Borg (2018), 1st place (13th Place Non Qualifier in Eurovision 2018 Semifinal)

Pabandom iš Naujo (Lithuania)
"Unbreakable", Aistė Pilvelytė (2020), 5th place

Controversies 
G:son and Henrik Sethsson's song for the 2001 Eurovision Song Contest, "Listen to Your Heartbeat", was accused of being too plagiarized from Belgium's 1996 entry "Liefde is een kaartspel". The songwriters denied the accusation, but after the Belgian songwriters and the author's organisation SABAM pressed for legal action, a cash settlement was agreed.

References

External links
 G:songs website

1968 births
Living people
Swedish composers
Swedish male composers
Melodi Grand Prix composers
Melodi Grand Prix
Swedish rock guitarists
Eurovision Song Contest winners